Chen Kenmin (Chin Kenmin; June 27, 1912 – May 12, 1990) was a Chinese-born Japanese chef known as the father of Chen Kenichi, the Iron Chef Chinese on the television show Iron Chef.

Born in Yibin, Sichuan, China, Chen emigrated to Japan in 1952 and became a Japanese citizen in 1954. Chen had originally specialized in Chinese imperial cuisine. However, in 1958, upon opening the  restaurant in Japan, Chen arranged his dishes to cater to the tastes of his Japanese clients. Chen introduced Shanghai-style Sichuan cuisine to Japan through the Shisen Hanten Restaurant as well as through nationwide TV shows, particularly NHK's TV show, Kyō no ryōri ("Today's Cuisine" in English). Chen came to be known as the "father of Chinese Sichuan cooking" in Japan.

In 1998, Masuyoshi Kimura, a chef who had been personally trained by Chen Kenmin, appeared as a challenger on Iron Chef, but rather than competing against Chen Kenmin's son, Iron Chef Chen Kenichi, Masuyoshi chose Masaharu Morimoto to be his opponent.  Chen Kenichi was present for and watched the battle.

Chen Kenmin's popular dishes
Among the many Shanghai-style Japanese Chinese dishes Chen popularized in Japan include:
 Mapo doufu.

References
 A large portion of this article was translated from the corresponding article in the Japanese Wikipedia, retrieved on February 5, 2007.

1912 births
1990 deaths
Chinese chefs
Chinese Civil War refugees
Chinese emigrants to Japan
Japanese chefs
Naturalized citizens of Japan
People from Yibin
Sichuan cuisine